The Royal Order of the Omujwaara Kondo (English: Order of the Coronet Wearer) is the oldest and highest royal order of the Bunyoro-Kitara Kingdom and is awarded solely by the Omukama (King) of Bunyoro. It is a single-grade honour, separated into two classes - Class I and Class II. Class I is limited to other royal families of the world and heads of state, while Class II is open to all persons.

The Order was recognised as an "old-established Order of distinction" in the 1955 Bunyoro Agreement signed jointly by Sir Andrew Benjamin Cohen on behalf of the British Government and the Omukama (King) Sir Tito Gafabusa Winyi IV.

The Order is one of three royal orders established or reformed in 2010 as a part of a modernization process in the Kingdom.

History of the Order

The first recorded recipient of the Order was Kasaru, the interpreter of Omukama Rukidi of Bunyoro, who ruled in the late 15th century, and therefore the Order is believed to be more than 500 years old. It was normal that recipients of the Order were awarded ownership of land and it was believed that they obtained a special divine power called mahano with the admission into the Order.

Recipients were awarded an Ekondo (English:coronets) and other regalia, and had special seats during ceremonies of the Kingdom. Recipients were not allowed to eat common food like potatoes and beans, instead they were expected to follow a special diet, containing primarily meat, poultry and other finer/rare foods.

When awarded the Order, recipients obtain the title of "Omujwaara Kondo" (English: Coronet wearer) and became an Abajwaara Kondo (a member of the group of Omujawaara Kondos). It was also normal to award recipients with elaborate headdresses made from beard and skin of the Colobus Monkey.

The Order has, compared to European standards, more characteristics of a title of nobility (the award being a title and a coronet) than of an Order of Chivalry. When the British conquered the Kingdom however, the Bunyoro Agreements of 1933  and 1955 between the Kingdom and the British Government recognized the Omukama's power to award this ancient honour, which was then classified as an "Order of Distinction".

After Uganda gained its independence from Britain in 1962, Omukama Sir Winyi IV continued to award the honour until 1967, when the Kingdoms were abolished  by dictator Milton Obote. The Kingdom of Bunyoro-Kitara was restored on June 11, 1993  with the enthronement of H.M. Solomon Iguru I, son of H.M. Omukama Sir Winyi IV of Bunyoro, the Omujwaara Kondo, similar to the other traditional honours of Bunyoro-Kitara, is once again being awarded.

The Order is listed as a "Non-Ruling Dynastic Honor and Order of Merit" by the Augustan Society.

Current Order

Originally, when being awarded the Order, recipients would swear an oath of loyalty to the King, and drink a bowl of milk with the King, but now the drinking of milk is optional. How the tradition of drinking milk started is not known, but it is believed to have ties with the former large herds of Ankole cattle, which were an important part of Bunyoro economy, history and culture.

The Order was revised on March 22, 2010, by Solomon Iguru I, in an attempt to modernize it. Since then the honour has been updated to be a breast star that is 90 millimeters in diameter. This star is worn at Empango ceremonies  or other appropriate formal occasions, and member of the Order sits in a special place of honour during the Empango events. Traditionally the Order was only given to men, but since its restoration in 2010, women are also allowed admittance into the Order. The traditional ban on eating beans, potatoes and other vegetables has also been removed. Also recipients must be minimum 25 years of age. The honour is normally granted two times a year, once during the Empango ceremony (which most often is on June 11 each year) and the other on H.M. Solomon Iguru I's birthday on June 18.

The Order may be compared to, for example, the highest grades of the Order of Dannebrog or the Order of the Thistle. On account of its heritable nobility, it has been likened to a Baronetcy in the British Honours system.

Privileges and responsibilities for recipients

Section 5(b) of the Order's current statutes grants all recipients the style "The Most Honourable". However, persons entitled to an existing style that supersedes "The Most Honourable" will retain it within the Order's records. Second, per the aforementioned Section, a recipient is entitled to use the title of Omujwaara Kondo. Official authorization is granted for a male recipient to translate Omujwaara Kondo into "Crown Knight" in English and a female recipient may translate this into "Crown Dame". Third, the post-nominal of "OOKB" may be used after an honouree's name, which stands for Order of the Omujwaara Kondo of Bunyoro-Kitara Kingdom.

Heraldic privileges

Additionally, per Section 20 of the Order's statutes, persons who receive the honour are also entitled to the right to display certain heraldic privileges. This section reads:
"20. Heraldry of Members.  Heraldry has historically been limited in Bunyoro-Kitara Kingdom, with the exception of the Kingdom having an armorial achievement in the ensign of its historical flag and His Majesty the Omukama having similar heraldry. However, to honour some Members whose ancestors maintained heraldic customs, by authorization of His Majesty the Omukama, all Members of the Order who desire to have heraldry are entitled to display supporters and top their helm with a basic coronet if they desire to signify their status as Members."

Intergenerational transfer rules

In accordance with both the historical traditions of The Order of the Omujwaara Kondo and its modern statutes, the honour is inherited by the original grantee's eldest child of the same sex at the moment of the original grantee's death or renunciation of the honour. Intergenerational transfer rules for the honour are described in Statute 8. For male grantees, the honour passes by patrilineal primogeniture (from male to male) and for female grantees, the honour passes by matrilineal primogeniture (from female to female).

References 

 
Orders, decorations, and medals of Uganda
Omukama Chwa II Kabalega
Awards established in 2010